Haxhi is an Albanian masculine given name that derives from the muslim title Hajji, and may refer to:
Haxhi Ballgjini (born 1958), Albanian footballer
Haxhi Ymer Kashari (fl. 18th-century), Albanian poet 
Haxhi Krasniqi (aka Robin Krasniqi; born 1987), Kosovar-German boxer
Haxhi Lleshi (1913–1998), Albanian military leader and politician
Haxhi Neziraj (born 1993), Albanian footballer 
Haxhi Qamili (1876–1915), Albanian leader of an egalitarian, pan-Ottoman and an Islamic revolt 
Haxhi Zeka (1832-1902), Albanian nationalist leader 

Albanian masculine given names